Ro-37 may refer to:

IMAM Ro.37, an Italian reconnaissance biplane of 1934  
, an Imperial Japanese Navy submarine commissioned in June 1943 and sunk in January 1944